Carnival of Souls is a 1962 American independent horror film produced and directed by Herk Harvey and written by John Clifford from a story by Clifford and Harvey, and starring Candace Hilligoss. Its plot follows Mary Henry, a young woman whose life is disturbed after a car accident. She relocates to a new city, where she finds herself unable to assimilate with the locals, and becomes drawn to the pavilion of an abandoned carnival. Director Harvey also appears in the film as a ghoulish stranger who stalks her throughout. The film is set to an organ score by Gene Moore.

Filmed in Lawrence, Kansas, and Salt Lake City, Carnival of Souls was shot on a budget of $33,000, and Harvey employed various guerrilla filmmaking techniques to finish the production. It was Harvey's only feature film, and did not gain widespread attention when originally released as a double feature with the now mostly forgotten The Devil's Messenger in 1962.

Since the 1980s, the film has been noted by critics and film scholars for its cinematography and foreboding atmosphere. The film has a large cult following and is occasionally screened at film and Halloween festivals. The film's plot resembles that of Ambrose Bierce's 1890 story An Occurrence at Owl Creek Bridge.

Plot
In Kansas, Mary Henry is riding in a car with two other young women when two men challenge them to a road race. During the race, the women's car is nudged by the boys’ and plunges off a bridge into a muddy river. Three hours after the police start dredging the water to look for them, Mary miraculously surfaces on the river bank, but cannot remember how she survived.

Mary moves to Salt Lake City, where she has been hired as a church organist. While driving through the desert, Mary's radio starts playing nothing but strange organ music, and she has visions of a ghoulish, pasty-faced figure (simply called "The Man" in dialogue). She also sees a large, abandoned pavilion on the shores of the Great Salt Lake. A gas station attendant tells her the pavilion was first a bathhouse, then a dance hall, and finally a carnival before it closed.

In town, Mary rents a room. She meets the proprietor, who informs her that there is another lodger staying there. Mary unpacks her suitcase and goes to the church where she will be playing the organ. At the church she meets the minister and is invited to play the organ for the first time. At the minister's offer, Mary takes a ride out to the pavilion at the lake. She is stopped from entering by the minister who warns her that it is prohibited to enter.

When she returns to her lodgings Mary meets a creepy man, John, the only other lodger, who wants to become better acquainted.  Mary however, retreats as she is not interested. That night, she becomes upset when she sees The Man downstairs and retreats to her room. John brings her coffee and a bottle of whiskey at breakfast time before she goes shopping. Mary begins experiencing terrifying interludes when she becomes invisible and inaudible to the rest of the world, as if she simply were not there. When The Man appears briefly in front of her in a park, she flees, into the nearby arms of a Dr. Samuels. He tries to help her in his nearby office, acknowledging he is not a psychiatrist.

Mary's new employer, the minister, is put off when she declines a reception to meet the congregation. When she practices for the first time, she finds herself shifting from a hymn to eerie music. In a trance, she sees The Man and other ghouls dancing at the pavilion. The minister, hearing the strange music, denounces it as sacrilege and insists upon her resignation.

Mary had agreed to meet John after church and they go to a bar. Terrified of being alone with her nightmares, Mary says she wants John's company. When they return home, he is invited to her bedroom door. John tries to convince Mary to let him stay the night, but she walks away, apparently uninterested. Nevertheless, he follows her to her bedroom, where she sees The Man in the mirror. Frightened, she tells John what has been happening to her. He leaves, believing she is losing her mind.

After going back to Samuels' office, Mary believes she has to go to the pavilion. However, Mary is confronted by The Man and his fellow ghouls. She tries frantically to escape, boarding a bus to leave town, only to find that all the passengers are ghouls.

It is just a nightmare; she awakens in her car. In the end, she is drawn back to the pavilion, where she finds her tormentors dancing, a pale version of herself paired with The Man. When she runs away, the ghouls chase her onto the beach. She collapses as they close in.

The following day, Samuels, the minister, and police go to the pavilion to look for Mary. They find her footprints in the sand and they end abruptly in a complex group of prints. Back in Kansas, the girls' car is pulled from the river. Mary's body is in the front seat alongside the other two women. She was apparently dead all along.

Cast

Production

Development
Harvey was a director and producer of industrial and educational films based in Lawrence, Kansas, where he worked for the Centron Corporation. While returning to Kansas after shooting a Centron film in California, Harvey developed the idea for Carnival of Souls after driving past the abandoned Saltair Pavilion in Salt Lake City. "When I got back to Lawrence, I asked my friend and co-worker at Centron Films, John Clifford, who was a writer there, how he'd like to write a feature," Harvey recalled. "The last scene, I told him, had to be a whole bunch of ghouls dancing in that ballroom; the rest was up to him. He wrote it in three weeks."

Casting
In New York City, Harvey discovered then-twenty-year-old actress Candace Hilligoss, who had trained with Lee Strasberg, and cast her in the lead role of Mary Henry. Hilligoss had been offered a role in the Richard Hilliard-directed horror film Violent Midnight (1963), but opted for the role in Carnival of Souls. She stated that at the time, she took the role as a "take-the-money-and-run type of situation"; she was paid approximately $2,000 for her work in the film.

Filming
Harvey shot Carnival of Souls in three weeks on location in Lawrence and Salt Lake City, after taking three weeks off from his job at Centron in order to direct the film, and starting with an initial production budget of $17,000. He raised the $17,000 cash budget by asking local businessmen if they were willing to invest $500 in his production. The other $13,000 of the total $30,000 budget was deferred. Harvey was able to secure the rental of the Saltair Pavilion for $50, and several other scenes, such as the scene featuring Mary in the department store, were shot guerrilla style, with Harvey paying off locals to allow the crew to quickly film.  Hilligoss described the filming process as brisk, with the cast and crew working seven days a week.

Harvey employed techniques he had learned in his work on industrial films in order to limit production costs. There was not enough money for a process screen to create a rear projection effect, which was the method typically used at that time to create the impression that a scene was taking place inside a moving car, by combining footage shot inside a static car with separate footage of a moving background. Instead, Harvey used a battery-powered hand-held Arriflex camera to film the shots inside moving cars, removing the need for compositing. The Arriflex, which was at that time more often used by cameramen filming newsreel footage, also allowed them to use a moving camera in other scenes without the need for gear like dollies or cranes. Harvey's assistant director was Reza Badiyi, a young Iranian immigrant who was just beginning his film work in the States. At this time, Badiyi had been second-unit director on one other film, Robert Altman's directing debut, The Delinquents, but would go on to make (amongst other notable work) some of the best-known, iconic television series openings and montages, including Hawaii Five-O, Get Smart, and The Mary Tyler Moore Show. The shot in which the face of The Man appears in the car window was accomplished through the use of an angled mirror placed on the far side of the window. The scene at the start of the film in which the car goes off the bridge and into the river was filmed in Lecompton, Kansas. The town did not charge a fee for the use of the bridge, only requiring the film crew to replace the bridge's damaged rails once they were done filming. This was done, at a cost of $12 for the repair.

Musical score
Carnival of Souls features an original organ score by local Kansas City organist and composer Gene Moore. Film and music scholar Julie Brown comments on the score, noting: "The organ is one of the spectral presences in Carnival of Souls, summoning up, or being summoned up by, the various allusions in the film to cinema's past." Screenwriter John Clifford has stated that the locations Harvey chose for the film (particularly the Saltair Pavilion, and the grand church organ) influenced the decision to use an organ score. The onscreen depiction of the organ played by Mary was implemented by Harvey to add to the film's "Gothic look."

An original soundtrack album for Carnival of Souls was released in 1988, featuring Gene Moore's original musical score.

Release
Carnival of Souls had its world premiere at the Main Street Theatre in Lawrence, Kansas, in September 1962. While the US release of Carnival of Souls failed to include a copyright on the prints, automatically placing them in the public domain, the foreign release marketed by Walter Manley did contain a copyright card and was protected for overseas sales. The 35 mm theatrical prints were cut by Herz-Lion to 78 minutes  which trimmed the camera original. However, the 16 mm television copies were printed complete and individually cut by each station to fit their time slot, which is why they vary in length.

WOR-TV in New York City used to broadcast the film intact in a late night timeslot in the 1960s. The scenes cut by the theatrical distributor include a scene where Mary stops at a gas station and discusses the carnival building with the attendant, a longer dialogue sequence between the minister and carpenter and an extra scene where the doctor talks to the landlady. In 1989, the film was screened at festivals across Europe and the United States, affording it renewed public interest, and it has subsequently appeared at numerous Halloween film festivals.

Prints of Carnival of Souls vary in length from 78 minutes in theatrical release to 84 minutes in the original cut. While some sources have erroneously listed the film at a 91-minute-runtime, Michael Weldon stated in The Psychotronic Video Guide to Film that the original theatrical cut of the film ran approximately 80 minutes. He also stated that the director's cut, which runs 84 minutes, is "the best and most complete version we'll ever see."

Reception and legacy
Carnival of Souls went largely unnoticed by critics upon its initial release and received "delayed acclaim" in the ensuing decades, with numerous arthouse screenings in 1989 in conjunction with the Halloween season. It has since become regarded by many film schools as a classic, often praised for its lighting and sound design, in which "sight and sound come together... in a horrifying way." Some scholars, such as S. S. Prawer, consider Carnival of Souls more an art film than a straightforward horror film. The Time Out film guide commended the film's "striking black-and-white compositions, disorienting dream sequences and eerie atmosphere," adding that the film "has the feel of a silent German expressionist movie. Unfortunately, so does some of the acting, which suffers from exaggerated facial expressions and bizarre gesturing. But the mesmerising power of the carnival and dance-hall sequences far outweighs the corniness of the awkward intimate scenes."

Leonard Maltin gave Carnival of Souls a score of two-and-a-half out of four stars, calling the film an "eerie" and "imaginative low budget effort." Critic Roger Ebert, possibly referring to the similarly-themed The Hitch-Hiker episode aired two years earlier, likened the film to a "lost episode of The Twilight Zone," and noted that it possessed an "intriguing power." Joe Brown of The Washington Post remarked upon the film's cinematography, writing: "Harvey's camerawork gives a new twist to the word 'deadpan,' making the most mundane places and people imaginable seem like ghastly hallucinations, and the director shows a flair for elegantly employing existing locations and lighting for maximum disorientation value." Stephen Holden of The New York Times saw the 1989 screening at the Fantasy Festival and  wrote: "What has earned Carnival of Souls its reputation is the director's knack for building a mood of fatalistic angst." The Los Angeles Times Peter Rainer perceived the film's cinematography to be inconsistent in merit, called the acting "fairly amateurish to begin with, [and] has a one-take-only quality", and noted the "inept post-dubbing"; however, he wrote that "these rinky-dink elements only add to the horror."

TV Guide gave Carnival of Souls a score of three stars out of four, praising the film's atmosphere, acting, and eerie score, calling it, "A chilling ghost story with artistic pretensions." Film Reel.com gave Carnival of Souls a positive review, praising the film's atmosphere, slow-building tension, and disturbing visuals.

The site's consensus states that the film "offers delightfully chilling proof that when it comes to telling an effective horror story, less can often be much, much more".

Home media
Due to its public domain status in the United States, Carnival of Souls has been released in a significant number of formats through numerous distributors, which, according to film scholars Chris Vander Kaay and Kathleen Fernandez-Vander Kaay, has ensured it "a constant presence in the video market and [contributed to] its enduring cult popularity." The Criterion Collection issued a 2-disc DVD set of the film in 2000, featuring both a 78-minute theatrical version and an extended 84-minute director's cut. In 2009, Legend Films released the film on DVD featuring both the black-and-white and a colorized version of the directors cut, including an audio commentary track by comedian Michael J. Nelson, a former writer and host of Mystery Science Theater 3000. In 2016, the Criterion Collection reissued the film on DVD, as well as premiering it on Blu-ray, featuring a new restoration.

Carnival of Souls has gradually developed a cult following since its release and is now considered a low-budget classic. The film has since been included in multiple lists by various media outlets as one of the greatest horror films ever made. Complex magazine ranked Carnival of Souls number 39 on its list of the 50 scariest movies ever made. Slant Magazine placed the film at #32 on its "100 Best Horror Movies of All Time". Paste magazine ranked the film at #85 in its list of "100 Best Horror Movies of All Time".

In 2012, the Academy Film Archive restored Carnival of Souls. The film has been named as a precursor to the works of various filmmakers, including David Lynch, George A. Romero, Lucrecia Martel and James Wan.

The film was used for a RiffTrax Live event in October 2016, where former Mystery Science Theater 3000 cast members Bill Corbett, Kevin Murphy and Michael J. Nelson riffed the film for a live audience and broadcast to other theaters through NCM Fathom. Rifftrax's website offers the video downloads of the live performance as well as a studio-recorded riff of the film.

A novelization of the film titled Nightmare Pavilion written by Andrew J. Rausch was released by Happy Cloud Media in October 2020.

Remakes

Negotiations with the writer of Carnival of Souls, John Clifford, and the director Herk Harvey led in 1998 to a remake directed by Adam Grossman and Ian Kessner and starring Bobbie Phillips. The remake has little in common with the 1962 film, borrowing little more than the revelation at the end. Sidney Berger, who had appeared in the original film as John Linden, appeared in a cameo in the remake. The remake followed the story of a young woman (Phillips) and her confrontation with her mother's murderer. The filmmakers had asked for Candace Hilligoss, the star of the first film, to also appear, but she declined, feeling that Clifford and the filmmakers of the remake had shown disrespect to her in initiating the film without consulting her or considering her treatment for a sequel to the 1962 version. The remake was marketed as Wes Craven Presents 'Carnival of Souls. It received negative appraisals from most reviewers  and did not manage to secure theatrical release, going direct-to-video.

An unofficial remake of Carnival of Souls was released in 2008 under the title Yella, directed by Christian Petzold. This film is based loosely on the original.

In popular culture
When Mary is speaking to the manager of the organ factory at the beginning of the film, he says to her: "It takes more than intellect to be a musician. Put your soul into it. OK?" This sample was used on the 1998 song "Church of Noise" by the Northern Irish rock band Therapy?.

Mary laments towards the end of the film: "I don't belong in the world, that's what it is. Something separates me from other people. Everywhere I turn, there's something blocking my escape." A sample of this line was used at the beginning of the Lana Del Rey song "13 Beaches".

Clips of the film were used throughout the Drake video "Knife Talk".

The dancehall scenes featured at the end of the film were referenced in the music video for Phoebe Bridgers' "Smoke Signals".

See also
 List of American films of 1962
 List of cult films
 List of ghost films
 List of films in the public domain in the United States

References

Sources

External links

Critical essays
 Introduction to Carnival of Souls an essay by John Clifford at the Criterion Collection
 Carnival of Souls an essay by Bruce Kawin at the Criterion Collection

View the film
 
 

1962 films
1962 horror films
1960s supernatural horror films
1962 independent films
American black-and-white films
American supernatural horror films
American independent films
1960s English-language films
Films directed by Herk Harvey
Films shot in Kansas
Films shot in Salt Lake City
American ghost films
Films set in Utah
Films set in amusement parks
Articles containing video clips
1962 directorial debut films
1960s rediscovered films
Rediscovered American films
American exploitation films
1960s American films